Boddington is a surname. Notable people with the surname include:

 Ann Boddington (1929–2007), Canadian academic
 Craig Boddington (born 1952), American hunter
 Diana Boddington (1921–2002), British stage manager
 Harold Boddington (active 1903–05), English footballer
 Henry John Boddington (1811–1865), British landscape painter
 Jennie Boddington (1922–2015), Australian filmmaker and photography curator
 Karen Boddington, Australian singer-songwriter 
 Myles Boddington (1924–2002), English cricketer and golf administrator
 Peter Boddington (born 1942), British boxer  
 Samuel Boddington (1766–1843), Irish politician
 Thomas Boddington (1736–1821), English activist and merchant in the West Indies
 William Boddington (1910–1996), American field hockey player